San Roque, officially the Municipality of San Roque, is a 4th class municipality in the province of Northern Samar, Philippines. According to the 2020 census, it has a population of 29,882 people.

San Roque was originally a part of Pambujan.  San Roque is the Spanish language name for Saint Roch.

History
Republic Act No. 2102, which created the municipality of San Roque, was enacted without executive approval on March 28, 1959. The territory of the town was described as follows:
 On the north by the limits of the municipal water as prescribed by the Revised Administrative Code;
 On the Northeast in straight line starting from the seashore down to the Cacapisan Creek passing Dale up to the bank of the Pambujan River;
 On the East thru a straight line from the bank of the Pambujan River running south-westerly to the mouth of the Cabigaho Creek;
 On the West by a straight line retaining the former boundary between Mondragon and Pambujan.

The law creating the town referred to the barrios of Lao-angan, Coroconog, Dale, Balnasan, Bantayan, Pagsang-an, Malobago, Lawa-an, Ginagda-nan, and Balud and the sitio of Cabigaho as comprising the town.

Geography

Barangays
San Roque is politically subdivided into 16 barangays.
Balnasan
Balud
Bantayan
Coroconog
Dale
Ginagdanan
Lao-angan
Lawaan
Malobago
Pagsang-an
Zone 1 (Poblacion)
Zone 2 (Poblacion)
Zone 3 (Poblacion)
Zone 4 (Poblacion)
Zone 5 (Poblacion)
Zone 6 (Poblacion)

Climate

Demographics

Economy

Government

List of former chief executives
The following served as Municipal Mayors of San Roque, Northern Samar:
 Diego Merino (appointed, 1960–1963);
 Juan Abalon (elected, 1964–1967);
 Oscar Abalon (elected, 1968–1980);
 Lucio Abalon (elected, 1980-1981 - died in office 15 Sept 1981);
 Enriquito Lagrimas (succeeded, 1981–1986);
 Eliseo Lim (designated OIC, 1986–1987);
 Froctuoso Solomon (designated OIC, 1987–1988);
 Ramon Lubos (elected, 1988–1998);
 Benito Tuballas (succeeded, 1998);
 Don Abalon (elected, 1998–2004);
 Andre Abalon (elected, 2004-2013 - died in office 13 May 2013);
 Jocelyn Curso (succeeded, 2013);
 Don Abalon (elected 2013–present: first mayor to return to office)

List of barangay chairmen
Balnasan - Chairman: Ronald Mora (3rd Term)
Balud - Chairman: Diogenes Tuba (1st Term)
Bantayan - Chairman: Aurora Limpiado (1st Term)
Coroconog - Chairman: Luz Mora (2nd Term)
Dale - Chairman: Florentino Avalon (3rd Term)
Ginagdanan - Chairman:  Daniel Sallave (2nd Term)
Lao-angan - Chairman: Nardito Jarito (3rd Term)
Lawaan - Chairman: Olimpio Baluyot (1st Term)
Malobago - Chairman: Jerry Bantilo (1st Term)
Pagsang-an Chairman: Elmer Enero (2nd Term)
Zone 1 (Poblacion) - Chairman: Miguel Ferreras (1st Term)
Zone 2 (Poblacion) - Chairman: Antonio Baluyot (1st Term)
Zone 3 (Poblacion) - Chairman: Ricky Enero (1st Term)
Zone 4 (Poblacion) - Chairman: Elito Suan (2nd Term)
Zone 5 (Poblacion) - Chairman: Freddie Jarito (1st Term)
Zone 6 (Poblacion) - Chairman: Maritess Fuentes (1st Term)

References

External links
 [ Philippine Standard Geographic Code]
 Philippine Census Information
 Local Governance Performance Management System 

Municipalities of Northern Samar